Hans Stammreich (July 16, 1902 in Remscheid, Prussia, Germany - March 6, 1969 in São Paulo, Brazil), was a Brazilian chemist of German origin and an important pioneer of Raman spectroscopy and molecular spectroscopy.

Life 

After obtaining his PhD in physical chemistry after studying under Adolf Miethe at the Berlin Technical University, Stammreich became soon, partly influenced by his personal friendship with Albert Einstein, interested in molecular spectroscopy, especially Raman spectroscopy. After he was fired from TU Berlin in April 1933 because of his Jewish background, Stammreich emigrated to Paris, where he stayed until 1940, working in the labs of Paul Langevin and Charles Fabry at the Sorbonne, with a brief interruption in 1935/36, when he first made aliyah with his wife and briefly lived in Palestine (with a written recommendation letter by Einstein), and subsequently briefly worked in Teheran. In 1940, Stammreich and his wife obtained a visa for Brazil and emigrated via Casablanca. Whereas Stammreich's wife Charlotte could directly travel to Brazil without problems, Hans was briefly arrested and put in a POW camp by the French Vichy government, but was subsequently released and deported to Portugal, whence he left for Brazil.

In Brazil Stammreich became professor for Physical Chemistry at the University of São Paulo, where he soon resumed his work in Raman spectroscopy. Stammreich was an excellent experimenter, amongst many other innovations in 1956 he was the first to obtain Raman spectra with a Helium lamp. A detailed list of his scientific innovations can be found in the web article by Andre Trombetta cited below.

Sources 

 Bernhard Schrader and Andreas Otto, Hans Stammreich, Bunsen-Magazin, 2. Jahrgang, 5/2000, S. 120–122:
 Hans Stammreich: in André Trombetta, since 2011: „Neglected Science – Scientific Research in developing countries" http://www.neglectedscience.com/alphabetical-list/s/hans-stammreich

Brazilian chemists
Brazilian physicists
1902 births
1969 deaths
German emigrants to Brazil
Jewish emigrants from Nazi Germany to France
People from Remscheid
Academic staff of the Technical University of Berlin
Technical University of Berlin alumni